Bathyliotina is a genus of sea snails, marine gastropod mollusks in the family Liotiidae.

Description
The typical characteristics of this genus are:
 the thick shell is broader than high.
 the opening of the deep umbilicus is rather broad.
 the sculpture shows many blunt spines at its periphery.
 the outer lip is expanded to a considerable extent, formed by decreasing lamellar layers.

Species
 Bathyliotina armata (A. Adams, 1861)
 Bathyliotina glassi McLean, 1988
 Bathyliotina lamellosa (Schepman, 1908)
 Bathyliotina nakayasui Habe, 1981
 Bathyliotina schepmani Habe, 1953

References

 Habe 1961, Coloured illustrations of the shells of Japan (1962 edition) Vol.2: 13; appendix, p. 5,13.

 
Liotiidae